Thiruvaikuntam (Srivaikuntam) Taluk is a taluk of Thoothukudi district of the Indian state of Tamil Nadu. The headquarters of the taluk is the town of Srivaikuntam.

Demographics
According to the 2011 census, the taluk of Tiruvaikuntam had a population of 202,905 with 100,296  males and 102,609 females. There were 1023 women for every 1000 men. The taluk had a literacy rate of 76.91. Child population in the age group below 6 was 10,616 males and 10,232 females. 
Appanad Maravars are living in large numbers in this region  along with Yadav in Mukkani, Velur, Karungulam and  Nadars in cheraikulam, Athalikulam and Scheduled Caste . Appanad Maravar Villages are Velur Kasba, Velur Adichehanallur, Vallanadu, Tolappanpannai, Singathakurichi, Seydunganallur, Perur, Padmanabhamangalam, Nanalkadu, Muthulangurichi, Muruppanadukovilpattu, Mukkani, Manakkarai, Kongarayankurichi, Karungulam, Kalvay, Kaliyavur, Cherakulam, Alwarkarkulam, Alikkudi, Alanda, Agaram. Appanad Maravars use Pandian as their surname in this region. 
Tiruvaikuntam Taluka - Thoothukkudi

List of all towns and Villages in Tiruvaikuntam Taluka of Thoothukkudi district, Tamil Nadu. Complete details of Population, Religion, Literacy and Sex Ratio in tabular format.

	Town	State	Population

1	Tiruvaikuntam Town Panchayat	Tamil Nadu	15,847

2	Sayapuram Town Panchayat	Tamil Nadu	12,792

3	Eral Town Panchayat	Tamil Nadu	9,478

4	Perungulam Town Panchayat	Tamil Nadu	7,203

	Villages	Administrative Division	Population

1	Agaram		        1,924

2	Alanda		        2,513

3	Alikkudi		797

4	Alwarkarkulam		1,902

5	Aniyaparanallur		2,843

6	Arampannai		3,132

7	Arumugamangalam		1,189

8	Cherakulam		4,837

9	Chettimallanpatti	336

10	Deivaseyalpuram		819

11	Ellainayakkanpatti	1,682

12	Iruvappapuram		1,753

13	Kaliyavur		2,378

14	Kalvay		        3,266

15	Karungulam		6,449

16	Kilavallanadu		1,165

17	Kilpidagai Kasba	1,074

18	Kilpidagai Varadarajapuram	1,318

19	KilpidagaiAppankovil		875

20	Kilputhaneri		1,516

21	Kodungani		27

22	Kongarayankurichi	3,246

23	Korkai		       3,986

24	Kottarakkurichi	       3,858

25	Manakkarai		3,474

26	Mangalakkurichi		1,248

27	Manjanirkayal		1,143

28	Maramangalam		3,819

29	Meenakshipuram Sekkarakkudi	1,186

30	Mukkani		                6,851

31	Murappanadu Pudugramam		1,045

32	Muruppanadukovilpattu		1,566

33	Muthulangurichi		        1,066

34	Nallathi		        2,874

35	Nanalkadu		        619

36	Padmanabhamangalam		2,398

37	Palayakkayal		        5,024

38	Parakramapandi		        1,597

39	Perur		                1,419

40	Poovani	   	                2,914

41	Sekkarakkudi	        	5,166

42	Seydunganallur		        7,708

43	Singathakurichi	        	2,624

44	Siruthondanallur		4,495

45	Sivagalai	        	4,087

46	Srimulakkarai	         	4,363

47	Sriparankusanallur	 	1,477

48	Tannuthu	        	555

49	Terkukariseri	        	1,236

50	Tirupanichettikulam		795

51	Tiruppani Chettiyarpatti	229

52	Tirupuliyangudi	        	1,128

53	Tolappanpannai	         	1,611

54	Ulakkudi	        	759

55	Vadakkukariseri	        	1,189

56	Vadavallanadu	        	2,483

57	Valavallan	        	3,553

58	Vallakulam	        	3,313

59	Vallanadu	         	7,160

60	Vallanadu R.F.	        	4

61	Vasavappapuram	         	3,812

62	Velur Adichehanallur		1,422

63	Velur Kasba	        	2,923

64	Vitthalapuram	        	3,175

65	Vitthalapuram Kovilpattu	1,247

References 

https://www.census2011.co.in/data/subdistrict/5867-srivaikuntam-thoothukkudi-tamil-nadu.html

Taluks of Thoothukudi district